The 1970–71 season of the European Cup club football tournament was won by Ajax in the final against Panathinaikos. It was the first time the cup went to Ajax, beginning a three-year period of domination, and the second consecutive championship for the Netherlands. Feyenoord, the defending champions, were eliminated by Romanian club UTA Arad in the first round.

UEFA had introduced for first time the penalty shoot-out as a way of deciding drawn ties – doing away with the unsatisfactory tossing of a coin. They had also decided that the away goals rule should apply to all rounds, and not just the first two, as had been the case.

This season marked the first time in European Cup history that Real Madrid failed to qualify for the tournament, having appeared in all 15 previous seasons. It was also the first time a Greek team reached the final.

Bracket

Preliminary round

|}

First leg

Second leg

Austria Wien won 4–3 on aggregate.

First round

|}

First leg

Second leg

Cagliari won 3–1 on aggregate.

Atlético Madrid won 4–1 on aggregate.

Standard Liège won 7–0 on aggregate.

Legia Warsaw won 6–1 on aggregate.

Ajax won 4–2 on aggregate.

4–4 on aggregate; Basel won on away goals.

Waterford United won 4–1 on aggregate.

Celtic won 14–0 on aggregate.

Carl Zeiss Jena won 5–0 on aggregate.

Sporting CP won 9–0 on aggregate.

Red Star Belgrade won 4–2 on aggregate.

1–1 on aggregate; UTA Arad won on away goals.

Borussia Mönchengladbach won 16–0 on aggregate.

Everton won 9–2 on aggregate.

Panathinaikos won 7–1 on aggregate.

Slovan Bratislava won 4–3 on aggregate.

Second round

|}

First leg

Second leg

Atlético Madrid won 4–2 on aggregate.

Legia Warsaw won 2–1 on aggregate.

Ajax won 5–1 on aggregate.

Celtic won 10–2 on aggregate.

Carl Zeiss Jena won 4–2 on aggregate.

Red Star Belgrade won 6–1 on aggregate.

2–2 on aggregate; Everton won on penalties.

Panathinaikos won 4–2 on aggregate.

Quarter-finals

|}

First leg

Second leg

2–2 on aggregate; Atlético Madrid won on away goals.

Ajax won 3–1 on aggregate.

Red Star Belgrade won 6–3 on aggregate.

1–1 on aggregate; Panathinaikos won on away goals.

Semi-finals

|}

First leg

Second leg

Ajax won 3–1 on aggregate.

4–4 on aggregate; Panathinaikos won on away goals.

Final

Top scorers

The top scorers from the 1970–71 European Cup (excluding preliminary round) are as follows:

References

External links
1970–71 All matches – season at UEFA website
European Cup results at Rec.Sport.Soccer Statistics Foundation
 All scorers 1970–71 European Cup (excluding preliminary round) according to protocols UEFA
1970-71 European Cup

1970–71 in European football
European Champion Clubs' Cup seasons